Warsaw Community High School (WCHS) is a public high school located in Warsaw, Indiana (U.S.), the county seat of Kosciusko County. It is in the Warsaw Community Schools district. The principal of WCHS is Troy Akers.  The current building located on State Road 15 was built in 1990. In partnership with Warsaw Area Career Center (WACC), which is located on the property of WCHS, Warsaw is able to provide numerous career and college opportunities for students. WCHS offers Dual Credit, Advanced Placement credits, Honors credits, and the SAT.

The 2008 documentary film American Teen was filmed at the high school during the 2005-2006 school year.

Demographics
The demographic breakdown of Warsaw's enrollment in 2020-2021 is as follows:
White - 70.2%
Hispanic - 23.3%
Black - 1.9%
Asian - 1.4%
Multiracial - 3.0%
Economically Disadvantaged- 40.8%

Male- 50.4% Female- 49.6% (2018-2019)

Athletics
The Warsaw Tigers compete in the Northern Lakes Conference.  The school colors are orange, black and white.  The following IHSAA sanctioned sports are offered at Warsaw:

Baseball (boys)
Basketball (girls & boys)
Girls state champions - 1976, 1978
Boys state champions - 1984
Cross country (girls & boys)
Football (boys)
Golf (girls & boys)
Boys state champions - 2005
Gymnastics (girls)
Soccer (girls & boys)
Softball (girls)
State champions - 1991
Swimming (girls & boys)
Tennis (girls & boys)
Track (girls & boys)
Unified state champions - 2014
Volleyball (girls)
Wrestling (boys)

Activities and Clubs

Performing Arts 

 Marching Band
 Concert Band
 Winter Percussion
 Winter Winds
 Color Guard
 Dance
 Orchestra
 Choir
 Drama
 Thespian Troupe

Visual Arts 

 Painting
 Drawing
 Ceramics
 Graphic Design
 Video Game Design

Publications 

 Student News- WACC TV
 Newspaper- The Roar
 Yearbook

Academic Clubs 

 FCCLA
 FFA
 FBLA
 HOSA
 Academic Superbowl Teams- Social Studies, Math, Arts, Language Arts, History, etc.
 Mathletes
 German Club
 Art Club

Student organizations 

 Student Council
 NHS
 Key Club
 Octagon Club

References

External links
 

Public high schools in Indiana
Schools in Kosciusko County, Indiana
1990 establishments in Indiana